Ngalia, Ngaliya or Ngalea may be,

a dialect of the Warlpiri language in the Northern Territory, spoken by the Ngalia (Northern Territory)
a dialect of the Western Desert Language, also known as Ooldean, in Western/Southern Australia spoken by the Ngalia people